Manscaped is a male grooming company based in San Diego, California, US. It was founded in 2016 by Paul Tran and produces and distributes male grooming tools and hygiene products under the Manscaped brand.

History 
Manscaped was established in 2016 by founder and CEO Paul Tran to provide male grooming products targeted at pubic hair removal. The company uses the term manscaping, a long-standing neologism, as the basis of its branding, and is referenced in the Merriam-Webster definition of the word. It has also capitalized on the shock factor of addressing male hygiene taboos, alongside the use of pun-based humour and paid celebrity appearances, to build its name.

In October 2018, Manscaped was featured in the 10th series of ABC's "Shark Tank", represented by Tran's business partner and co-founder Steve King, who sought $500,000 in funding for the company, and accepted a handshake offer for that amount from Mark Cuban and Lori Greiner in exchange for a 25 percent stake in the business. However, the deal never materialized after the show, according to Cuban.

In late 2020, the company was reported to be exploring its options for further fundraising. At the time, it was backed by investment firms Kaktus Capital, Longley Capital, Rx3 Venture Partners and Scala Ventures. A prominent advertisement campaign for the company also aired in the same period featuring the NFL's Rob Gronkowski and US sportswear supermodel Camille Kostek.

In July 2021, Manscaped was revealed to be in ongoing merger discussion with Los Angeles-based blank-check firm Bright Lights to create a combined entity worth up to $1.4 billion. Led by Michael Mahan, the former CEO of Dick Clark Productions, Bright Lights listed for $230 million on the Nasdaq stock market in January 2021 on the promise of finding a merger target in the consumer products or media sectors.

In November 2021, it was confirmed that the merger would be going ahead at a valuation of around $1 billion "amid a difficult market". This followed reporting in October that suggested the company was considering a $500 million sale. Reuters noted that the merger was all but guaranteed after being backstopped by the actor Channing Tatum and two investment firms, Endeavor and Guggenheim Investments.

References and citations

External links 

Male grooming brands
Personal care brands
Skin care brands
Hair removal
American companies established in 2016
Companies based in San Diego County, California
2016 establishments in California